is a fictional gendarmerie-style information security and intelligence department from Masamune Shirow's Ghost in the Shell manga and anime series. In the franchise, its jurisdiction exists under the Ministry of Internal Affairs. In some translations, the name is given as Public Safety Section 9. In the original film, it is known as the Shell Squad or Security Police Section 9. In the original publication of the manga, it was known as Mobile Armored Riot Police Section 9. Regardless of translation, when spoken of by the characters, it is simply referred to as Section 9.

The Section-9 is composed of former military officers, forensics scientists, and police detectives; these agents answer only to the Chief Director and the Prime Minister of Japan. Most information about Section 9 remains highly classified; the Ministry of Home Affairs does not comment on the details of its activities. The public at large is unaware that Section 9 even exists, though the National Diet and other security forces sections are generally aware of them as a black operation unit. This allows Section-9 to operate independently from governmental oversight, cutting through red tape and bureaucracy.

Many of Section-9's functions are unique, its activities in support of national security are comparable to those of the American FBI, the British MI5 and the Russian FSB. Their structure was based on the German GSG-9. Due to cross-training exercises in the past with the British Special Air Service's (SAS) 22nd Regiment, which also included personnel exchanges, Section 9's structure has been partially influenced by the British SAS.

History
Public Security Section 9 was established as a search and rescue organization; its mission statement has evolved to meet the demands of an uncertain and changing world characterized by invisible enemies who can destabilize entire countries from a simple reach of their keyboard, and by a blurring of the lines—between war and politics, combatants and civilians, crime and terrorism—have become increasingly irrelevant.</ref>

Officially billed as an international organization, it is actually a covert counter-terrorist network and anti-crime unit operating in the Japanese National Public Safety Commission. The organization is modeled on the idea that counter-terrorism traditionally consists of two interlocking areas: "pre-" and a "post-incident". With its unique organizational structure, Section 9 is empowered and expected to handle both areas, removing bureaucracy and logistics that might otherwise slow down the process. Its operatives are allowed to act with or without government consent as they are almost unknown to the public eye.

In particular, Section 9 and its members are among the best counter-fourth generation cyberwarfare operatives in the country, and as a result usually end up involved in cybercrime cases relating to cybernetic lifeforms and the Internet, such as hacking and cyberterrorism. Even though Section 9 team is the "crème de la crème" of military prowess, there is a competitiveness with the other Section teams as well.

Ghost in the Shell (1995)
Major Motoko Kusanagi is dispatched by Section 9 to spy on a building in New Port City. A foreign power conspires to recruit a domestic programmer to fix the Project 2501 "bug." The team moves in while Major activates her thermoptic camouflage. The foreign official refuses to return the programmer, while Kusanagi moves in and kills him.

Stand Alone Complex

Season 1
During the investigation of the Laughing Man case, Major Kusanagi poses as the Laughing Man in order to uncover a conspiracy against Serano Genomics, a nanotechnology (micro machine) company owned by the Japanese government. After higher-ranking government officials uncover information about the Section 9 investigation, the government disbands the agency and declares war on them.

In preparation for an attack on their headquarters by the Umibozu's shock troopers and their Type 303 Armed Suit robots, all remaining Section 9 members barricade themselves into the building and fight the invaders with heavy weaponry. Failing that, they assemble a diversion and escape through a passage in the sewers of New Port City. They are all eventually captured, with the Major apparently killed.

Togusa spends the next three months wondering what happened to the rest of Section 9 before encountering Batou. The whole thing turns out to have been Aramaki's plan, sacrificing Section 9 in order to leave the prime suspect wide-open to arrest, investigation, and prosecution. Everyone, including the Major is fine, and Aramaki is in the process of rebuilding and securing funding for the newly-reborn Section 9, which happens in 2nd GIG.

Season 2

The second season starts with Section 9 non-existent in an official capacity due to an amendment to the Special Forces Bill. The first episode involves a hostage situation in which nine terrorists, who call themselves the Individual Eleven, are holed up in the Chinese Embassy, demanding a swift change in the Refugee Action Policy. They demand the freedom of the refugees from the stand point that refugees drain the country. The previous Japanese Prime Minister issued a temporary bill that allowed for the entrance of refugees into certain zones, but the bill was never repealed. Because the new Prime Minister, Kayabuki, plans to repeal the policy soon, she has to act quickly on the terrorists before their demands become known in order to ensure it doesn't appear that she was caving in to the terrorists' pressure.

Section 9 is promised full reestablishment, and the approval of their new budget proposal that includes the reinstatement of think tanks (Tachikomas), on the condition that there are no hostage casualties in the process of stopping the terrorists before the press blackout runs out. From this point on the 2nd season goes on to focus on the refugee issue from multiple perspectives, along with providing additional background information on almost all of the characters.

A new group emerges in this season, The Individual Eleven. This group first appears in the premiere episode as a group of Individual Eleven "copycats" take hostages in the Chinese Embassy. Later in the series it is revealed that the Individual Eleven's true intentions were to harm the wellbeing of refugees that had taken shelter in Japan at the end of World War IV. This group destroys itself in a public display of mutually assisted suicide among the members. Only one survives, Hideo Kuze, who then sides with the refugees and confounds Section 9 as to his motives.

Solid State Society
Section 9 is radically reformed after the Major leaves in order to pursue investigations of her own. The section has increased in size, and is now run by Togusa because Batou declined the position. Solid State Society initially focuses on the cyberbrain suicides of members of a terrorist organization that gained asylum in Japan. This case leads to the discovery that around twenty thousand children may have been abducted. The mastermind behind the crimes is known as "The Puppeteer," and is classified as a Super Wizard Class Hacker.

Arise
Arise is an alternate universe telling of the formation of Section 9. Major Kusanagi, an ex-army hacker, is recruited by Aramaki and charged with putting together a team to deal with high level hacking threats. Over the course of the series, while pursuing her own personal investigation, she encounters and works with (sometimes double crossed by) all of the original team members. At the end of the series she offers them positions on her team. A notable change is that Togusa is involved from the beginning rather than being recruited some time after the team's formation.

Ghost in the Shell (2017)
According to Tawanda Manyimo, part of what makes the Section 9 group so interesting is they aren't controlled by the government. "We are able to cut through red tape and bureaucracy it seems," he said "Who doesn’t want that? We can actually just do what we want, in essence. And we answer to essentially to Aramaki and the Major, so we’re almost a rogue renegade, but not quite. And I think that’s a unique position because in the world, there is a lot of political intrigue."

Location
Public Security Section 9 is located in the fictional Japanese city of Niihama-shi (also known as New Port City). The exact location of Section 9's headquarters is held as top-secret and is only known by the Japanese government and Section 9 employees. Their building is known to the public as a false security company.

Section 9 Headquarters facilities include a rooftop helipad, underground car park, Operator-managed control room, cyber-warfare and information gathering room, holding cells, meeting rooms and Tachikoma/Fuchikoma/Uchikoma workshop.

Members

Section 9's operatives are versatile, quiet professionals: trained in various methods ranging from criminal investigation, cybercrime-criminology, and digital forensics to unconventional warfare, special reconnaissance, information operations, cyberwarfare, counter-terrorism, hostage rescue, direct action and special operations.

Agents

AI personnel

References

Further reading
 

Fictional law enforcement agencies
Fictional paramilitary organizations
Fictional counterterrorism organizations
Ghost in the Shell

fr:Section 9